Mark Greenwald (born December 1, 1968) is an American speed skater. He competed at the 1988 Winter Olympics and the 1992 Winter Olympics. In 2010, he became the Executive Director of US Speedskating.

References

External links
 

1968 births
Living people
American male speed skaters
Olympic speed skaters of the United States
Speed skaters at the 1988 Winter Olympics
Speed skaters at the 1992 Winter Olympics
Speed skaters from Chicago